Corporation Street Bridge is a skyway which crosses Corporation Street in Manchester city centre, Manchester. The bridge replaced the old footbridge, which was damaged beyond repair in the 1996 Manchester bombing. The bridge is shaped in the form of a hyperboloid and links the Marks & Spencer/Selfridges building to the Manchester Arndale.

History

The new footbridge was proposed by Manchester-based architects Hodder + Partners, whose entry won the design competition in 1997. Construction swiftly began and was soon complete in time for opening in 1999.

The structure has won numerous awards and the new footbridge has symbolised the renaissance of Manchester city centre since the bomb. The bridge was one of the earliest structures to be built after the bomb and overhangs the spot where the bomb exploded.

In 2011, the bridge received a seven-month renovation at a cost of £730,000. Repairs included fixing cracked window panes and permanently replacing floor panels.

Awards
RIBA Award 2000
British Constructional Steelwork Association's Structural Steel Award 2000
American Institute of Architects Award 2000

See also
 Hyperboloid structure
 List of hyperboloid structures
 Vladimir Shukhov

References

External links

- Corporation Street Bridge at Hodder + Partners

Bridges in Greater Manchester
Bridges completed in 1999
1999 establishments in England
Skyways